Mahur Berenji-ye Sofla (also Romanized as Māhūr Berenjī-ye Soflá; also known as Mahoor Berenji, Māhūr, and Māhūr Berenjī-ye Pā’īn) is a village in Mahur Berenji Rural District, Sardasht District, Dezful County, Khuzestan Province, Iran. At the 2006 census, its population was 835, in 163 families.

References 

Populated places in Dezful County